Angala Devi, also known as Angalamman and Angala Paramesvari, is an aspect of the Hindu goddess Parvati, primarily worshipped in the villages of South India as a kaval deivam, a guardian deity. She is often additionally considered to be an aspect of one of the Matrikas.

Legend
According to regional folklore, an asura once performed a tapasya to propitiate the destroyer deity, Shiva. Even as deities like Indra and Varuna urged Shiva not to grant the asura a boon, Shiva was moved by the asura's austerities and granted him his desired immortality. This asura went on a killing spree, threatening the munis and attacking Devaloka. When these sages complained to Parvati, Shiva granted her the boon of the ability to slay this asura. Parvati took the form of Angala Paramesvari and chased the asura, who sought refuge in a cremation ground. He entered a corpse to escape her wrath, but Angala was able to slay him, after which she tied a number of his bones around her waist and danced the ananda tandavam.

See also
Isakki
Matrikas 
Shitala
Sudalai Madan

Notes

References
 W.T. Elmore, Dravidian Gods in Modern Hinduism.

Tamil deities
Hindu goddesses